Bettada Kalla (Kannada: ಬೆಟ್ಟದ ಕಳ್ಳ) is a 1957 Indian Kannada film, produced and directed by S. M. S. Naidu. The film stars Kalyan Kumar, Mynavathi, R. Nagendra Rao and Udaykumar in the lead roles. The film has musical score by S. M. Subbaiah Naidu. The movie was a remake of the director's own 1954 Tamil movie Malaikkallan, thereby becoming the first remake in the Kannada film industry.

Cast

Kalyan Kumar
Mynavathi
R. Nagendra Rao
Udaykumar
Ganapathi Bhat
G. V. Iyer
H. Ramachandra Shastry
Eshwarappa
Manyam
Nanjappa
Revathi
Jayashree
Ramadevi
Sayee
Padmini Priyadarshini

Soundtrack

References

External links
 

1957 films
1950s Kannada-language films
Kannada remakes of Tamil films
Films directed by S. M. Sriramulu Naidu